The Market Theatre, based in the downtown bohemian suburb of Newtown in Johannesburg, South Africa, was opened in 1976, operating as an independently, anti-racist theatre during the country's apartheid regime. It was named after a fruit and vegetable market that was previously located there. It was also known as the Old Indian Market or the Newtown Market, which closed after 60 years. The Market Theatre was renamed John Kani Theatre in 2014 after the renowned South African stage actor John Kani.

History

Structure
In 1974, a group of theatre people came together, called , and included Mannie Manim and the late Barney Simon. They began fundraising to restore the neglected complex that housed the old produce market in downtown Johannesburg.

The original steel structure had been shipped from Britain and constructed on site. The steel arches and cathedral-like dome built in 1913 that housed the Indian Fruit Market were considered one of the most important pieces of organic architecture in South Africa. On Sundays, the main hall of the complex was used for symphony concerts.

Renovation began, with much of the work being done by the artists themselves. Today most of the original Edwardian architecture remains, as do a number of the original
signs. It houses both Museum Africa and The Market Theatre complex.

Importance during apartheid

By the 1970s there was heavy international pressure for South Africa to reform its apartheid laws. It was during this turbulent time, on 21 June 1976, that the Market Theatre opened its doors with Barney Simon as its artistic director. The first production, under his direction, was The Seagull by Anton Chekhov with Sandra Prinsloo in the cast . In time the non-racial Market Theatre became known international as the "Theatre of the Struggle" and was one of the few places in the 1980s that blacks and whites could mix on equal terms.
"The strength and truth of that conviction was acknowledged(...)In providing a voice to the voiceless, The Market Theatre did not forego artistic excellence, but, rather, made a point of it."

A multitude of anti-apartheid plays were staged, including Reza de Wet's multi award-winning, African Gothic, and Woza Albert, Asinamali, Bopha, Sophiatown, You Strike The Woman, You Strike A Rock, Born in the RSA and Black Dog – Inj’emnyama. The Market Theatre's cultural contribution to South Africa's emergence as a democracy in 1994 is significant.

Awards
In 1994 the Market Theatre was the recipient of the American Jujamcyn Award to honour a South African theatre organisation that had made an outstanding contribution to the development of creative talent in the history of the country's theatre. During its history, the Market Theatre has received 21 international awards and over 300 South African awards, which include Fleur du Cap and Naledi Theatre Awards.

Facilities
The Market Theatre complex houses three theatres: the Barney Simon Theatre (opened in June 1976), the Main Theatre (opened in October 1976) and the Laager Theatre (named in 1979). In addition to hosting productions, the theatres are also used for conferences, seminars, presentations and product launches.

Barney Simon Theatre
Named after one of the co-founders of the Market Theatre, and a stalwart of the South African theatre industry, the Barney Simon Theatre was the first to open in the Market Theatre complex, while restorations to the historical building were still in progress. It has seating for 120 people.

Main Theatre
Four months after the Market Theatre opened with the staging of The Seagull, the Main Theatre opened to the public on 19 October 1976. The first production was Peter Weiss's Marat/Sade.

The Main Theatre is the largest of the three theatres of the Market Theatre complex and seats up to 387 people.

Laager Theatre
The first show to be staged in what was once a photo gallery in the Market Theatre complex was called Die Van Aardes Van Grootoor in August 1978. The theatre was named
the Laager by prominent theatre personality and social activist Pieter-Dirk Uys in 1979.

A laager, also known as a wagon fort, is a fortification made of wagons joined together, usually in a circular shape, as an improvised military camp to safeguard those taking refuge inside. Pieter then found the name Laager appropriate for he too needed a safe place to perform under the apartheid regime.

Other
The Market Theatre complex also houses two art galleries, a jazz club, a cabaret venue,a bookshop, two restaurants (the Market Bar & Bistro and the historical Gramadoelas), a coffee bar, a theatre bar, a shopping mall, and a flea-market every Saturday.

Development

True to its roots, the modern-day Market Theatre remains dedicated to growing and cultivating the arts in South Africa through various initiatives such as the Lab and
the Market Photo Workshop. The Market Photo Workshop is a school of photography that has been in operation for over 20 years, with a special focus on introducing the art of photography to previously disadvantaged students.

The Rockefeller Foundation provided the seed money to start the Market Theatre Laboratory, a drama school founded by Barney Simon and Dr John Kani. The Lab opened in October 1989 in a small warehouse under the highway in Goch Street Newtown, and is dedicated to developing community theatre and skills training in the arts.

From 1994, the Lab and later the Market Theatre formed a long-term partnership with the Swedish International Development Agency (SIDA) and Stockholm City Theatre. The Lab holds two annual festivals, the Community Theatre Festival and the Zwakala Festival.

In 2010 the Market Theatre Laboratory moved to the Bus Factory, 3 President Street, Newtown where the Market Photo Workshop is also located.

Selection of featured artists
Over the years the Market Theatre hosted performances by a number of internationally acclaimed artists
including Athol Fugard. The great South African actress Yvonne Bryceland and collaborator of Athol Fugard was also involved in the evolution of the Market Theatre as a centre of theatre against apartheid
In October 1987 Janet Suzman directed a multi-racial production of Othello at The Market Theatre. Suzman also directed Brecht's 'Good Woman of Setzuan ' (renamed The Good Woman of Sharpeville).

It has also introduced the works of many of South Africa's leading playwrights, directors and actors, including: Vanessa Cooke, Welcome Msomi, Zakes Mda, Pieter-Dirk Uys, Gibson Kente, Paul Slabolepszy, Mbongeni Ngema, Adam Small, PG du Plessis, Lara Foot, Janice Honeyman, Kessie Govender, Bartho Smit, Maishe Maponya, Sue Pam-Grant,Andrew Buckland, Percy Mtwa, Deon Opperman, [[Reza de Wet],Fiona Ramsay, Robert Whitehead and Matsemela Manaka.

See also
The Suit, a short story by Can Themba, first adapted into a play by Barney Simon and Mothobi Mutloatsi and performed at the Market Theatre in 1994.

References

External links

 The Market Theatre
 The Theatre That Reflects the Soul of Johannesburg
 South Africa Info

Theatres in South Africa
Tourist attractions in Johannesburg
Culture of Johannesburg
Buildings and structures in Johannesburg
Retail markets in South Africa